Geneviève Raugel (27 May 1951 – 10 May 2019) was a French mathematician working in the field of numerical analysis and dynamical systems.

Biography 

Raugel entered the École normale supérieure de Fontenay-aux-Roses in 1972, obtaining the agrégation in mathematics in 1976. She earned her Ph.D degree from University of Rennes 1 in 1978 with a thesis entitled Résolution numérique de problèmes elliptiques dans des domaines avec coins (Numerical resolution of elliptic problems in domains with edges).

Raugel got a tenured position in the CNRS the same year, first as a researcher (1978–1994) then as a research director (exceptional class from 2014 on). Beginning in 1989, she worked at the Orsay Math Lab of CNRS affiliated to the University of Paris-Sud since 1989.

Raugel also held visiting professor positions in several international institutions: the University of California, Berkeley (1986–1987), Caltech (1991), the Fields Institute (1993), University of Hamburg (1994–95), and the University of Lausanne (2006). She delivered the Hale Memorial Lectures in 2013, at the first international conference on the dynamic of differential equations, Atlanta.

She co-directed the international Journal of Dynamics and Differential Equations from 2005 on.

Research 
Raugel's first research works were devoted to numerical analysis, in particular finite element discretization of partial differential equations. With Christine Bernardi, she studied a finite element for the Stokes problem, now known as the Bernardi-Fortin-Raugel element. She was also interested in problems of bifurcation, showing for instance how to use invariance properties of the dihedral group in these questions.
  
In the mid-1980s, she started working on the dynamics of evolution equations, in particular on global attractors, perturbation theory, and the Navier-Stokes equations in thin domains. In the last topic she was recognized as a world expert.

Selected publications 
with Christine Bernardi, Approximation numérique de certaines équations paraboliques non linéaires, RAIRO Anal. Numér. 18, 1984–3, 237–285.
with Jack Hale: Reaction-diffusion equation on thin domains, Journal de mathématiques pures et appliquées 71, 1992,  33–95.
with Jack Hale: Convergence in gradient-like systems with applications to PDE,  Z. Angew. Math. Phys. 43, 1992, 63–124.
Dynamics of Partial Differential Equations on Thin Domains, in: R. Johnson (ed.),  Dynamical systems. Lectures given at the Second C.I.M.E. (Montecatini Terme, Juni 1994), Lecture Notes in Mathematics 1609, Springer 1995, S. 208–315
with Jerrold Marsden, Tudor Ratiu: The Euler equations on thin domains, International Conference on Differential Equations (Berlin, 1999), World Scientific, 2000,  1198–1203
with Klaus Kirchgässner: Stability of Fronts for a KPP-system: The noncritical case, in: Gerhard Dangelmayr, Bernold Fiedler, Klaus Kirchgässner, Alexander Mielke (eds.), Dynamics of nonlinear waves in dissipative systems: reduction, bifurcation and stability, Longman, Harlow 1996,  147–209; part 2 (The critical case): J. Differential Equations, 146, 1998, S. 399–456.
Global Attractors in Partial Differential Equations, Handbook of Dynamical Systems, Elsevier, 2002, p. 885–982.
with Jack Hale: Regularity, determining modes and Galerkin methods, J. Math. Pures Appl., 82, 2003,  1075–1136.
with Romain Joly:  A striking correspondence between the dynamics generated by the vector fields and by the scalar parabolic equations, Confluentes Math., 3, 2011,  471–493, Arxiv
with Marcus Paicu: Anisotropic Navier-Stokes equations in a bounded cylindrical domain, in: Partial differential equations and fluid mechanics, London Math. Soc. Lecture Note Ser., 364, Cambridge Univ. Press, 2009,  146–184, Arxiv
with Romain Joly: Generic Morse-Smale property for the parabolic equation on the circle, Transactions of the AMS, 362, 2010,  5189–5211, Arxiv
with Jack Hale: Persistence of periodic orbits for perturbed dissipative dynamical systems, in: Infinite dimensional dynamical systems, Fields Institute Commun., 64, Springer, New York, 2013,  1–55.

References

External links 
 

1951 births
2019 deaths
French women mathematicians
20th-century women mathematicians
20th-century French mathematicians
21st-century women mathematicians
21st-century French mathematicians
ENS Fontenay-Saint-Cloud-Lyon alumni
University of Rennes alumni
Academic staff of Paris-Sud University
Dynamical systems theorists
PDE theorists
20th-century French women
21st-century French women